The 2022 Faroe Islands Premier League was the 80th season of top-tier football in the Faroe Islands, and the 18th under the current format.

KÍ were the defending champions, having won their 19th Faroese title in the previous season.

Teams
TB Tvøroyri (relegated after five years in the top flight) and ÍF (relegated after three years in the top flight) were relegated after last season. They were replaced with Skála and AB Argir (both promoted after a one-year absence).

League table

Fixtures and results
Each team plays three times (either twice at home and once away or once at home and twice away) against each other team for a total of 27 matches each.

Rounds 1–18

Rounds 19–27

Top scorers

References

External links
  
 Faroe Islands Premier League on Flashscore

Faroe Islands Premier League seasons
1
Faroe
Faroe